Roseaux is a commune in the Corail Arrondissement, in the Grand'Anse department of Haiti. It has 28,811 inhabitants.

Settlements in Roseaux: 
Annete, Boise Sec, Fond d'Acaque, Gomier, Grand Vincent, La Basulle, Nan Plingue and Roseaux

References

Populated places in Grand'Anse (department)
Communes of Haiti